Lucas Pirard (born 10 March 1995) is a Belgian professional footballer playing for Union SG in the Belgian First Division A as a goalkeeper.

Club career
On 11 July 2019 he signed a 3-year contract with Waasland-Beveren.

After playing for Union SG on loan in the spring of 2021, on 16 June 2021 he re-joined the club for the 2021–22 season.

References

External links

1995 births
Living people
People from Sprimont
Association football goalkeepers
Standard Liège players
Lommel S.K. players
Sint-Truidense V.V. players
S.K. Beveren players
Royale Union Saint-Gilloise players
Belgian footballers
Belgium under-21 international footballers
Belgium youth international footballers
Belgian Pro League players
Challenger Pro League players
Footballers from Liège Province